This is a list of Norwegian sweets and desserts. The cuisine of Norway refers to food preparation originating from Norway or having a played a great historic part in Norwegian cuisine. Norway also shares many dishes and influences with surrounding Scandinavian countries, such as Sweden, Finland, and Denmark.

Characteristics
Norwegian desserts mainly feature small, tart fruits, such as strawberries, blueberries, lingonberries, gooseberries, and cloudberries, due to their ability to grow in colder climates.  Rye flour is a very common ingredient in bread-based recipes, as well as almonds and almond flavoring.

Holidays in Norway feature particularly decadent and intricate desserts, as Christmas is an important holiday in Norwegian culture.

Norwegian desserts

Gallery

See also
 Norwegian cuisine
 List of Norwegian dishes
 List of desserts

References